Thomas Fred "Puny" Wilson (October 31, 1899 – May 24, 1969) was an American football player and coach. He was an All-American  at Texas A&M University in the early 1920s, playing for coach Dana X. Bible. Wilson graduated from Texas A&M in 1924 and was later inducted into school's hall of fame.

Puny and his brother, Mule, are the only two brothers in the Texas A&M football Hall of Fame. Mule was the first Aggie to play in the National Football League (NFL).  He won three NFL championships, one on the New York Giants and two with the Green Bay Packers

In 1938, Wilson became head football coach at Sam Houston State University in Huntsville, Texas. He compiled a 50–49–6 overall record in 11 seasons. He also briefly coached Dan Rather.

Wilson died after a cerebral hemorrhage in 1969. He was buried at Tyler Memorial Park in Tyler, Texas. In his later life he worked as a real estate agent.

Head coaching record

Football

References

Further reading

External links
 

1899 births
1969 deaths
American football ends
American men's basketball coaches
Basketball coaches from Texas
Sam Houston Bearkats athletic directors
Sam Houston Bearkats football coaches
Sam Houston Bearkats men's basketball coaches
Texas A&M Aggies football players
People from Fannin County, Texas